Bemidji is a city and the county seat of Beltrami County, in northern Minnesota, United States. The population was 14,574 at the 2020 census. According to 2021 census estimates, the city is estimated to have a population of 15,279, making it the largest commercial center between Grand Forks, North Dakota and Duluth.

As a central city for three Indian reservations, Bemidji is the site of many Native American services, including the Indian Health Service. Near Bemidji are the Red Lake Indian Reservation, White Earth Indian Reservation, and the Leech Lake Indian Reservation. Bemidji lies on the southwest shore of Lake Bemidji, the northernmost lake feeding the Mississippi River; it is nicknamed "The First City on the Mississippi". Bemidji is also the self-proclaimed "curling capital" of the U.S. and the alleged birthplace of legendary Paul Bunyan.

Etymology 
According to Minnesota Geographic Names, its name derives from the Ojibwe Buh-mid-ji-ga-maug (Double-Vowel orthography: bemijigamaag), meaning "a lake with crossing waters". This name stems from the way that the Mississippi River flows directly through the Lake. Shay-now-ish-kung, an Ojibwe leader, moved to the area in 1882 and became the first permanent settler of Bemidji. He informed early white settlers of the name of the lake, but they misunderstood him to mean that bemidji was his own name. Consequently, he was known to them as Chief Bemidji.

On occasion, in Ojibwe, Bemidji is called Wabigamaang ("at the lake channel/narrows"), because part of the city is situated on the Lakes Bemidji/Irving narrows, on the south end of Lake Bemidji, and extends to the eastern shore of Lake Irving.

History
Beltrami County was created on February 28, 1866, by an act of legislation.

Bemidji Township was surveyed by European Americans in 1874. It was organized in 1896, 24 days after the village of Bemidji was chartered, and is the oldest township in the county. In 1897, the county attorney declared the original Bemidji township organization illegal (no reason given) and the township reorganized on June 26, 1897.

About 50 Leech Lake Indians lived along the south shore of the lake prior to the 1880s. They called the lake Bemidjigumaug, meaning "river or route flowing crosswise". Freeman and Besty Doud claimed 160 acres west of and including present-day Diamond Point; they were Bemidji's first homesteaders. The Porter Nye family soon followed them.

John Steidl's sawmill was on the east bank of the Mississippi River, close to Carson's Trading Post. Remore Hotel and Carl Carlson's blacksmith shop were on the west side of the river. Bemidji was incorporated on May 20, 1896, and by that time there were three publishing companies, Alber Kaiser, The Bemidji Pioneer, and the Beltrami County News. William Bartleson's Stage and Express Service was created to carry mail between Bemidji and Park Rapids. He was advertised by Speelman's Eagle, owned by Clarence Speelman, along with other stores. By 1898, railroads came to Bemidji and brought even more business. By 1900 the Village of Bemidji's population had grown to 2,000.

Thomas Barlow Walker and John S. and Charles Pillsbury invested millions into timber in 1874, since beaver pelts were nearing depletion by the mid-1890s. Walker owned Red River Lumber Company of Crookston, which claimed almost half of Beltrami County's timber. He soon sold his sawmill and timber claim to Thomas Shevlin and Frank Hixon. Logging was done in the winter and sawmilling in the summer. Crookston opened 13 logging camps, which provided jobs and homes for lumberjacks. Between 1907 and 1910 drought and forest fires came to northern Minnesota. Lumber production was Bemidji's major industry, but on July 19, 1914, a sawmill burned down, causing disaster for business. It was later rebuilt. During the Great Depression of the 1930s, Bemidji's business profited, providing food, materials, and services for the Civilian Conservation Corps and Youth Conservation Corps programs. During the war years lumber business stopped, but when men came back from war lumber business boomed, since many people needed homes.

By the 1870s, timber cruisers were already making forays into the great pine forests that surrounded Bemidji. They were seeking new timberlands for Walker, the Pillsburys, Henry Akeley, Charles Ruggles and Frederick Weyerhaeuser, the barons of the wood industry.

Art Lee created the story that the folkloric figure Paul Bunyan came from the Northwoods. Tales about Paul Bunyan and Babe the Blue Ox led to public sculptures of them in the 1930s. According to Discover America, the Paul and Babe statues are "the second most photographed statues in America," surpassed only by Mount Rushmore. The Rotarians of Bemidji commissioned the statue of Paul Bunyan during the Great Depression as a tourist attraction. It was unveiled on January 15, 1937, to kick off a Winter Carnival that drew more than 10,000 visitors.

Today Bemidji is an important educational, governmental, trade and medical center for north central Minnesota. The wood industry is still a significant part of the local economy, with Georgia-Pacific, Potlatch, and Northwood Panelboard all having waferboard plants in the local area. They use wood species that were once classified as waste trees.

Parks and recreation
Bemidji is near Chippewa National Forest, Itasca State Park, Lake Bemidji State Park, Big Bog State Recreation Area, and state forest areas.

The Paul Bunyan State Trail runs from Brainerd, Minnesota, and Lake Bemidji State Park. It is used for walking, biking, snowmobiling, and cross-country skiing. There is also a bike trail around Lake Bemidji about 17 miles long. Each year an event is held where families and individuals can bike around the lake, with rest stops along the way.

Art in the Park, hosted by Paul Bunyan Communications and Watermark Art Center, is held every year at Bemidji Library Park, across from the Watermark Art Center. Art in the Park has been a summer highlight for Bemidji residents since 1967. The event features more than 100 artists, food vendors, and live entertainment. A variety of items are sold, made in such materials as wood and ceramics, along with clothing and jewelry, photography, metalworking, greeting cards, homemade preserves, food, candles, and soaps. Roughly 4,000 people attend annually. The festival has been renamed the Watermark Art Festival and was held at Library Park on July 16-17, 2022. 

Every year, in the first week of August, teams compete in the Dragon Boat races. There are also many food vendors, kids' activities, and musical and cultural performances. In the early 21st century, dragon boat racing was the fastest growing water sport in the nation.

The Bemidji Polar Days, also known as Winterfest, is a weeklong festival that includes many different activities, such as a polar plunge, and sled derby, broomball, a 5k polar walk/run, curling, pond hockey, and a cornhole tournament.

The Paul Bunyan Triathlon takes place the third Saturday in August. The Minnesota Finlandia Ski Marathon is also held in Bemidji.

Geography

Four-lane U.S. Route 2, U.S. Route 71 and Minnesota State Highway 197 are three of the main routes in the city. Minnesota State Highways 89 and 371 are nearby.

The largest earthquake on record for the Bemidji area was recorded on September 3, 1917. It is claimed that it shook houses in Bemidji and across northern Minnesota. The closest and most recent quake occurred in Walker, Minnesota, on September 27, 1982, with a magnitude of 2.0.

Climate
Bemidji has a hemiboreal humid continental climate, Dfb in the Köppen climate classification: short, warm summers, and long, severe winters. The average mean annual temperature in Bemidji is 38.6 degrees Fahrenheit. The coldest month is January with an average daily high of 16 degrees and an average daily low of −5 degrees. The warmest month is July with an average daily high of 77 degrees and an average daily low of 57 degrees. The average annual humidity is 47%. The average annual snowfall is 46.7 inches and the average annual rainfall is 26.6 inches. The average day Lake Bemidji freezes over is November 26 and the average day the ice goes off the lake is April 26.

Annual snowfall in the Bemidji Area increased 5% in the 21st century vs. the 1930–1999 period, according to the National Weather Service.

Demographics

2020 census
As of the census of 2020, there were 14,574 people residing in the city, and 6,265 households with an average size of 2.15.  The racial makeup of the city was 79.4% White, 2.2% African American, 8.5% Native American, 0.8% Asian, 0.0% Pacific Islander, and 9.0% from two or more races. Hispanic or Latino of any race were 2.1% of the population.

20.0% of residents were under the age of 18, 6.5% were under 5 years of age, and 15.3% were 65 and older.

2010 census
As of the census of 2010, there were 13,431 people, 5,339 households, and 2,557 families residing in the city. The racial makeup of the city was 81.3% White, 1.2% African American, 11.3% Native American, 1.4% Asian, 0.1% Pacific Islander, 0.3% from other races, and 4.4% from two or more races. Hispanic or Latino of any race were 1.9% of the population.

There were 5,339 households, of which 24.9% had children under the age of 18 living with them, 28.7% were married couples living together, 14.4% had a female householder with no husband present, 4.8% had a male householder with no wife present, and 52.1% were non-families. Of all households, 38.6% were made up of individuals, and 16.7% had someone living alone who was 65 years of age or older. The average household size was 2.18 and the average family size was 2.83.

The median age in the city was 27.1 years. 19.4% of residents were under the age of 18; 26.7% were between the ages of 18 and 24; 21.6% were from 25 to 44; 17.5% were from 45 to 64; and 14.8% were 65 years of age or older. The gender makeup of the city was 47.7% male and 52.3% female.

Economy

Major Employers
According to the City's 2021 Comprehensive Annual Financial Report, the largest employers in the city are:

Industries

These are the top 15 industries in Bemidji. On the United States Census Bureau American Factfinder, some industries had a range of employees, so the average number of employees were used. Also, some industries, such as healthcare and social assistance, professional, scientific, and technical services, other services, arts, entertainment, and reaction, and educational services were split into three different categories. The number of employees for the three categories was combined into one category.

Government

Bemidji's government is made up of a mayor and a council, with the latter elected from five single-member districts or wards.

Politics

Culture

Bemidji is a college city, with strong arts influences. The city's streets are lined with small shops and adorned with sculptures and other forms of public art.

The Concordia Language Villages are near Bemidji. They have supported several language conversational groups (including French, Chinese, Norwegian, Spanish, Italian, and German) that meet weekly in local coffeehouses. In 2018 Concordia's Korean Language Village received a $5 million grant. The Korean village is the newest of the Villages.

In 2011, Chairman Floyd Jourdain Jr. of the Red Lake Ojibwe Nation complimented Bemidji's Ojibwe language signage in places of business.

During the summer, the Paul Bunyan Playhouse operates a non-Equity, summer stock theater at the Chief Theater. The Bemidji Community Theatre provides live theatre there when the Paul Bunyan Playhouse is not in operation. Bemidji is also home to the Bemidji Symphony Orchestra (BSO), which was established in 1938 under the auspices of what was then Bemidji State College. In 2000 the BSO became an independent arts organization.

The statues of Paul Bunyan and Babe the Blue Ox are a popular tourist destinations. Many people photograph themselves in front of them. The statues are next to the Bemidji Tourist Information Center, where tourists can learn about local activities, events, and attractions. The center also includes many artifacts of the lumberjack's legend and a giant visitors' book travelers can sign; the names go back a long time. An old fireplace there was built with 900 stones, taken from every state in the United States, and most of the Canadian provinces, and Minnesota national parks.

Sports

The city is well-known to hockey fans. As a Division II team, Bemidji State was a hockey dynasty in the 1980s and '90s. Bemidji State was in the title game eight straight years, winning five titles. It became a Division I team in 1999, and has not won any Division I titles.

The city is also familiar to curling fans. Both men's and women's rinks from the Bemidji Curling Club won the right to represent the United States in the 2005 World Curling Championship and the 2006 Winter Olympics in Torino, Italy. Pete Fenson, the skip of the U.S. curling team that took the bronze medal at the 2006 Olympics, is a native of Bemidji, as is Natalie Nicholson, who was the lead for the United States women's team at the 2010 Winter Olympics in Vancouver.

A city referendum for a Bemidji Regional Events Center passed by a slim majority of 43 votes out of 4,583 cast in November 2006. Opening in 2010, the center was renamed the Sanford Center and serves as home to the Bemidji State University hockey team. The men's and women's hockey teams are both members of the Western Collegiate Hockey Association.  From 2014 to 2015, the Sanford Center was the home of the city's first-ever professional sports team, the Bemidji Axemen of the Indoor Football League.

From January 16 to January 19, Bemidji hosted Hockey Day Minnesota, a three-day event aired on Fox Sports. The Bemidji High School and Bemidji State University boys and girls hockey teams both played on outdoor rinks outside of the Sanford Center. The Minnesota Wild team also played on the outdoor rinks.

In 2013, runners signed up for the first Bemidji Blue Ox Marathon. The race, run in October, draws athletes and recreational runners from around the region. The events spawned a weekend of races that includes two kids races, a 5K, 10K, half-marathon and a 26K that circles Lake Bemidji.

Education
Bemidji is home to Bemidji State University, Northwest Technical College, and Oak Hills Christian College. Public education, served by Bemidji Area Schools, is a part of Independent School District 31, and includes eight elementary schools, a middle school, and a high school. Also in the district are TrekNorth Charter High School, Voyagers Charter High School, Schoolcraft Charter School, and Bemidji is home to three private schools: St. Philip's Catholic School, St. Mark's Lutheran School and Heartland Christian Academy.

Regional center
Bemidji is as a regional center for shopping, arts, entertainment, education, health services, worship, and government services. The Bemidji area includes parts or all of Beltrami (pop. 46,380), Hubbard (pop. 21,715), Cass (pop. 30,639), Itasca (pop. 45,070), Koochiching (pop. 11,941), Lake of the Woods (pop. 3,823), Marshall (pop. 8,988), Pennington (pop. 13,780), Red Lake (pop. 3,933), Clearwater (pop. 8,576), and Mahnomen (pop. 5,414) counties, the White Earth (pop. 9,726) and Leech Lake (pop. 11,388) Reservations and the Sovereign Nation of Red Lake (pop. 5,506). Lexington Realty International places the Bemidji Area population at 200,259 in the 2021 Estimate.

Media

Newspapers
The Bemidji Pioneer is the local newspaper, published twice weekly on Wednesday and Saturday. Now owned by Forum Communications Company, it was founded as a weekly in 1896.

TV stations
Most of Bemidji's TV stations primarily rebroadcast the television stations of the Twin Cities.

Radio stations

FM

AM

Magazines
 inBemidji, a quarterly lifestyle magazine focused on the Bemidji area. First published in December 2013 (as inMagazine) by The Bemidji Pioneer.
 Northwoods Woman, a bimonthly magazine published from 2008 to 2013, launched in Bemidji, Walker and Park Rapids, included articles about women who live and work in northern Minnesota.

Infrastructure

Major highways
The following routes are in the Bemidji area.

  U.S. Highway 2
  U.S. Highway 71
  Minnesota State Highway 89
  Minnesota State Highway 197

Air service
Bemidji is served by Bemidji Airport, which has passenger services on three airlines, Delta Connection, Sun Country Airlines and Bemidji Airlines, the latter of which is based in Bemidji. Bemidji Airlines also operates cargo flights, while Corporate Air is the only airline to operate all-cargo-only flights to the airport, on behalf of FedEx Express.

Notable people

 Russell A. Anderson, Chief Justice of the Minnesota Supreme Court
 Elmer E. Berglund, Minnesota state representative and railroad conductor
 Roy C. Booth, author
 Harry A. Bridgeman, Minnesota state senator and railroad locomotive engineer
 Gary Burger, guitarist and lead vocalist for the band The Monks
 Dave Casper, football player
 Bob Decker, Minnesota state senator and educator
 Leonard R. Dickinson, Minnesota state legislator and businessman
 Pete Fenson, American curling skip
 Terry Frost, actor
 Bryan Hickerson, baseball player
 Bob A. Johnson, Minnesota state representative
 Frank Moe, Minnesota state representative
 Joe Motzko, hockey player
 Kent Nerburn, author
 Brian Paulson, record producer and musician
 Jane Russell, actress
 Gary Sargent, ice hockey defenseman
 Gail Skare, Minnesota state representative
 Kerry Taylor, baseball player 
 Theodore W. Thorson, Minnesota state representative
 David Tomassoni, Minnesota state legislator
 Will Weaver, author and professor emeritus

In popular culture
The first season of the FX TV series Fargo, starring Billy Bob Thornton and Martin Freeman, is mainly set in and around Bemidji and Duluth. It was filmed in Calgary, Alberta.

Gallery

References

External links

 City of Bemidji
 Bemidji Area Chamber of Commerce
 The Bemidji Pioneer, newspaper

 
Cities in Beltrami County, Minnesota
Cities in Minnesota
County seats in Minnesota
Minnesota populated places on the Mississippi River